Tinuj (also Romanized as Ţīnūj) is a village in Ashtian County, Markazi Province, Iran. At the 2006 census, its population was 215, in 92 families.

References 

Populated places in Markazi Province